Silverado may refer to:

Places 

Silverado, California, United States, an unincorporated community
Silverado Canyon, Orange County, California, near the above community; associated with Silverado Creek
Silverado Trail, a scenic route in Napa Valley
Silverado Park, Long Beach, California, a city park
Silverado Formation, a geologic formation in California
Silverado, Calgary, Alberta, Canada, a neighborhood
The Silverado Galaxy, officially named NGC 3370

Other uses 
Silverado Policy Accelerator, co-founded by Dmitri Alperovitch 
Chevrolet Silverado, a full-size pickup truck
Silverado (film), a 1985 American western film
"Silverado", a 1981 single by The Marshall Tucker Band
Silverado High School (disambiguation)
Silverado Country Club, a private golf club in Napa County, California
Silverado (gay bar), a gay bar and strip club in Portland, Oregon, United States
Silverado Savings and Loan, a bank involved in the 1980s savings and loan crisis
Rio Grande Valley Silverados, original name of the Kentucky Mavericks, an American Basketball Association franchise